Hannes van der Merwe (born February 5, 1980) was a Namibian cricketer. He was a right-handed batsman and a right-arm offbreak bowler.

Born in Windhoek, the young batsman played in several youth one-day internationals during the Under-19 World Cups of 1997/98 and 1999/2000, his first match coming against Bangladesh Under-19s on January 12, 1998, where he was bowled out by a duck by Shabbir Khan.

Two years later, in the 1999/2000 Under-19 World Cup, he watched Australia Under-19s beat his team by 266 runs in a match dominated by Australian attack. He took part in the 2004 Intercontinental Cup where the Namibians lost by five wickets to Uganda.

External links
Hannes van der Merwe at Cricket Archive 

1980 births
White Namibian people
Namibian Afrikaner people
Cricketers from Windhoek
Namibian cricketers
Living people
Namibian people of Dutch descent